Goniaea opomaloides is a species of grasshopper in the family Acrididae. It was described by Francis Walker in 1870.

Synonyms
The following are synonyms of this species:
Goniaea fuscosparsa Sjöstedt, 1921
Goniaea glaucipes Sjöstedt, 1921
Goniaea latipennis Sjöstedt, 1921
Goniaea obscura Sjöstedt, 1921
Goniaea rugulosa Stål, 1873
Goniaea vinaceipennis Sjöstedt, 1921

References

opomaloides
Insects described in 1870